Shanao may refer to:

 Shanao (city), capital of the Shanao District
 Shanao District, Peru
 Takuya Sugi, a Japanese professional wrestler